Stomphastis crotoniphila is a moth of the family Gracillariidae. It is known from South Africa.

The larvae feed on Croton sylvaticus. They mine the leaves of their host plant. The mine has the form of a moderate, irregular, oblong to semi-circular, transparent blotch mine which starts as an extremely long and narrow gallery.

References

Endemic moths of South Africa
Stomphastis
Moths of Africa